Chulabhorn is a princess of Thailand.

Chulaborn may also refer to the following, named after her the princess:

 Chulabhorn District, in Nakhon Si Thammarat Province
 Chulabhorn Dam, on the Nam Phrom River in Chaiyaphum Province
 Chulabhorn Graduate Institute, a multidisciplinary post-graduate academic institute
 Chulabhorn Research Institute, a biomedical and chemistry research institute in Bangkok
 Princess Chulabhorn's College, a group of science coeducation boarding schools